

Events

Pre-1600
 455 – Sack of Rome: Vandals enter Rome, and plunder the city for two weeks.
1098 – First Crusade: The first Siege of Antioch ends as Crusader forces take the city; the second siege began five days later.

1601–1900
1608 – London: Virginia gets new charter, extending borders from "sea to sea". 
1615 – The first Récollet missionaries arrive at Quebec City, from Rouen, France.
1676 – Franco-Dutch War: France ensured the supremacy of its naval fleet for the remainder of the war with its victory in the Battle of Palermo.
1692 – Bridget Bishop is the first person to be tried for witchcraft in Salem, Massachusetts; she was found guilty and later hanged.
1763 – Pontiac's Rebellion: At what is now Mackinaw City, Michigan, Chippewas capture Fort Michilimackinac by diverting the garrison's attention with a game of lacrosse, then chasing a ball into the fort.
1774 – Intolerable Acts: The Quartering Act is enacted, allowing a governor in colonial America to house British soldiers in uninhabited houses, outhouses, barns, or other buildings if suitable quarters are not provided.
1780 – The anti-Catholic Gordon Riots in London leave an estimated 300 to 700 people dead.
1793 – French Revolution: François Hanriot, leader of the Parisian National Guard, arrests 22 Girondists selected by Jean-Paul Marat, setting the stage for the Reign of Terror.
1805 – Napoleonic Wars: A Franco-Spanish fleet recaptures Diamond Rock, an uninhabited island at the entrance to the bay leading to Fort-de-France, from the British.
1835 – P. T. Barnum and his circus start their first tour of the United States.
1848 – The Slavic congress in Prague begins.
1866 – The Fenians defeat Canadian forces at Ridgeway and Fort Erie, but the raids end soon after.
1896 – Guglielmo Marconi applies for a patent for his wireless telegraph.

1901–present
1909 – Alfred Deakin becomes Prime Minister of Australia for the third time.
1910 – Charles Rolls, a co-founder of Rolls-Royce Limited, becomes the first man to make a non-stop double crossing of the English Channel by plane.
1919 – Anarchists simultaneously set off bombs in eight separate U.S. cities.
1924 – U.S. President Calvin Coolidge signs the Indian Citizenship Act into law, granting citizenship to all Native Americans born within the territorial limits of the United States.
1941 – World War II: German paratroopers murder Greek civilians in the villages of Kondomari and Alikianos.
1946 – Birth of the Italian Republic: In a referendum, Italians vote to turn Italy from a monarchy into a Republic. After the referendum, King Umberto II of Italy is exiled.
1953 – The coronation of Queen Elizabeth II at Westminster Abbey becomes the first British coronation and one of the first major international events to be televised.
1955 – The USSR and Yugoslavia sign the Belgrade declaration and thus normalize relations between the two countries, discontinued since 1948.
1962 – During the FIFA World Cup, police had to intervene multiple times in fights between Chilean and Italian players in one of the most violent games in football history.
1964 – The Palestine Liberation Organization (PLO) is formed.
1966 – Surveyor program: Surveyor 1 lands in Oceanus Procellarum on the Moon, becoming the first U.S. spacecraft to soft-land on another world.
1967 – Luis Monge is executed in Colorado's gas chamber, in the last pre-Furman execution in the United States.
  1967   – Protests in West Berlin against the arrival of the Shah of Iran are brutally suppressed, during which Benno Ohnesorg is killed by a police officer. His death results in the founding of the terrorist group Movement 2 June.
1979 – Pope John Paul II starts his first official visit to his native Poland, becoming the first Pope to visit a Communist country.
1983 – After an emergency landing because of an in-flight fire, twenty-three passengers aboard Air Canada Flight 797 are killed when a flashover occurs as the plane's doors open. Because of this incident, numerous new safety regulations are put in place.
1990 – The Lower Ohio Valley tornado outbreak spawns 66 confirmed tornadoes in Illinois, Indiana, Kentucky, and Ohio, killing 12. 
1997 – In Denver, Timothy McVeigh is convicted on 15 counts of murder and conspiracy for his role in the 1995 bombing of the Alfred P. Murrah Federal Building in Oklahoma City, in which 168 people died. He was executed four years later.
2003 – Europe launches its first voyage to another planet, Mars. The European Space Agency's Mars Express probe launches from the Baikonur space center in Kazakhstan.
2012 – Former Egyptian President Hosni Mubarak is sentenced to life imprisonment for his role in the killing of demonstrators during the 2011 Egyptian revolution.
2014 – Telangana officially becomes the 29th state of India, formed from ten districts of northwestern Andhra Pradesh.
2022 – Following a request from Ankara, the United Nations officially changed the name of the Republic of Turkey in the organization from what was previously known as "Turkey" to "Türkiye."

Births

Pre-1600
1305 – Abu Sa'id Bahadur Khan, ruler of Ilkhanate (d. 1335) 
1423 – Ferdinand I of Naples (d. 1494)
1489 – Charles, Duke of Vendôme (d. 1537) 
1535 – Pope Leo XI (d. 1605)

1601–1900
1602 – Rudolf Christian, Count of East Frisia, Ruler of East Frisia (d. 1628)
1621 – Rutger von Ascheberg, Courland-born soldier in Swedish service (d. 1693)
  1621   – (baptized) Isaac van Ostade, Dutch painter (d. 1649)
1638 – Henry Hyde, 2nd Earl of Clarendon (d. 1709)
1644 – William Salmon, English medical writer (d. 1713)
1731 – Martha Washington, First Lady of the United States (d. 1802)
1739 – Jabez Bowen, American colonel and politician, 45th Deputy Governor of Rhode Island (d. 1815)
1740 – Marquis de Sade, French philosopher and politician (d. 1814)
1743 – Alessandro Cagliostro, Italian occultist and explorer (d. 1795)
1773 – John Randolph of Roanoke, American planter and politician, 8th United States Ambassador to Russia (d. 1833)
1774 – William Lawson, English-Australian explorer and politician (d. 1850)
1813 – Daniel Pollen, Irish-New Zealand politician, 9th Prime Minister of New Zealand (d. 1896)
1823 – Gédéon Ouimet, Canadian lawyer and politician, 2nd Premier of Quebec (d. 1905)
1835 – Pope Pius X (d. 1914)
1838 – Duchess Alexandra Petrovna of Oldenburg (d. 1900)
1840 – Thomas Hardy, English novelist and poet (d. 1928)
  1840   – Émile Munier, French artist (d. 1895)
1857 – Edward Elgar, English composer and educator (d. 1934)
  1857   – Karl Adolph Gjellerup, Danish author and poet, Nobel Prize laureate (d. 1919)
1861 – Concordia Selander, Swedish actress and manager (d. 1935)
1863 – Felix Weingartner, Croatian-Austrian pianist, composer, and conductor (d. 1942)
1865 – George Lohmann, English cricketer (d. 1901)
  1865   – Adelaide Casely-Hayford, Sierra Leone Creole advocate and activist for cultural nationalism (d. 1960)
1866 – Jack O'Connor, American baseball player and manager (d. 1937)
1875 – Charles Stewart Mott, American businessman and politician, 50th Mayor of Flint, Michigan (d. 1973)
1878 – Wallace Hartley, English violinist and bandleader (d. 1912)
1881 – Walter Egan, American golfer (d. 1971)
1891 – Thurman Arnold, American lawyer and judge (d. 1969)
  1891   – Takijirō Ōnishi, Japanese admiral and pilot (d. 1945)
1899 – Lotte Reiniger, German animator and director (d. 1981)
  1899   – Edwin Way Teale, American environmentalist and photographer (d. 1980)

1901–present
1904 – Frank Runacres, English painter and educator (d. 1974)
  1904   – Johnny Weissmuller, Hungarian-American swimmer and actor (d. 1984)
1907 – Dorothy West, American journalist and author (d. 1998)
  1907   – John Lehmann, English poet and publisher (d. 1987)
1910 – Hector Dyer, American sprinter (d. 1990)
1911 – Joe McCluskey, American runner (d. 2002)
1913 – Barbara Pym, English author (d. 1980)
  1913   – Elsie Tu, English-Hong Kong educator and politician (d. 2015)
1915 – Alexandru Nicolschi, Romanian spy (d. 1992)
1917 – Heinz Sielmann, German photographer and director (d. 2006)
1918 – Ruth Atkinson, Canadian-American illustrator (d. 1997)
  1918   – Kathryn Tucker Windham, American journalist and author (d. 2011)
1920 – Frank G. Clement, American lawyer and politician, 41st Governor of Tennessee (d. 1969)
  1920   – Yolande Donlan, American-English actress (d. 2014)
  1920   – Marcel Reich-Ranicki, Polish-German author and critic (d. 2013)
  1920   – Tex Schramm, American businessman (d. 2003)
  1920   – Johnny Speight, English screenwriter and producer (d. 1998)
1921 – Betty Freeman, American photographer and philanthropist (d. 2009)
  1921   – Ernie Royal, American trumpet player (d. 1983)
  1921   – Sigmund Sternberg, Hungarian-English businessman and philanthropist (d. 2016)
  1921   – András Szennay, Hungarian priest (d. 2012)
1922 – Juan Antonio Bardem, Spanish director and screenwriter (d. 2002)
  1922   – Carmen Silvera, Canadian-English actress (d. 2002)
1923 – Lloyd Shapley, American mathematician and economist, Nobel Prize laureate (d. 2016)
1924 – June Callwood, Canadian journalist, author, and activist (d. 2007)
1926 – Chiyonoyama Masanobu, Japanese sumo wrestler, the 41st Yokozuna (d. 1977)
  1926   – Milo O'Shea, Irish-American actor (d. 2013)
1927 – W. Watts Biggers, American author, screenwriter, and animator (d. 2013)
  1927   – Colin Brittan, English footballer (d. 2013)
1928 – Erzsi Kovács, Hungarian singer (d. 2014)
  1928   – Rafael A. Lecuona, Cuban-American gymnast and academic (d. 2014)
  1928   – Ron Reynolds, English footballer (d. 1999)
1929 – Norton Juster, American architect, author, and academic (d. 2021)
  1929   – Ken McGregor, Australian tennis player (d. 2007)
1930 – Pete Conrad, American captain, pilot, and astronaut (d. 1999)
1933 – Jerry Lumpe, American baseball player and coach (d. 2014)
  1933   – Lew "Sneaky Pete" Robinson, drag racer (d. 1971)
1934 – Johnny Carter, American singer (d. 2009)
1935 – Carol Shields, American-Canadian novelist and short story writer (d. 2003)
  1935   – Dimitri Kitsikis, Greek poet and educator (d. 2021)
1936 – Volodymyr Holubnychy, Ukrainian race walker (d. 2021)
1937 – Rosalyn Higgins, English lawyer and judge
  1937   – Sally Kellerman, American actress (d. 2022) 
  1937   – Jimmy Jones, American singer-songwriter (d. 2012)
  1937   – Robert Paul, Canadian figure skater and choreographer
  1937   – Deric Washburn, American screenwriter and playwright
1938 – Kevin Brownlow, English historian and author
  1938   – George William Penrose, Lord Penrose, Scottish lawyer and judge
1939 – Charles Miller, American musician (d. 1980)
  1939   – John Schlee, American golfer (d. 2000)
1940 – Constantine II of Greece (d. 2023)
1941 – Ünal Aysal, Turkish businessman
  1941   – Stacy Keach, American actor 
  1941   – Lou Nanne, Canadian-American ice hockey player and manager
  1941   – Charlie Watts, English drummer, songwriter, and producer (d. 2021)
1942 – Mike Ahern, Australian politician, 32nd Premier of Queensland
1943 – Charles Haid, American actor and director
  1943   – Crescenzio Sepe, Italian cardinal 
1944 – Robert Elliott, American actor (d. 2004)
  1944   – Marvin Hamlisch, American composer and conductor (d. 2012)
1945 – Richard Long, English painter, sculptor, and photographer
  1945   – Bonnie Newman, American businesswoman and politician
1946 – Lasse Hallström, Swedish director, producer, and screenwriter
  1946   – Peter Sutcliffe, English serial killer (d. 2020)
1948 – Jerry Mathers, American actor
1949 – Heather Couper, English astronomer and physicist (d. 2020)
  1949   – Frank Rich, American journalist and critic
1950 – Joanna Gleason, Canadian actress and singer
  1950   – Momčilo Vukotić, Serbian footballer and manager (d. 2021)
1951 – Gilbert Baker, American artist, gay rights activist, and designer of the rainbow flag (d. 2017)
  1951   – Arnold Mühren, Dutch footballer and manager
  1951   – Larry Robinson, Canadian ice hockey player and coach
  1951   – Alexander Wylie, Lord Kinclaven, Scottish lawyer, judge, and educator
1952 – Gary Bettman, American commissioner of the National Hockey League 
1953 – Vidar Johansen, Norwegian saxophonist
  1953   – Craig Stadler, American golfer
  1953   – Cornel West, American philosopher, author, and academic
1954 – Dennis Haysbert, American actor and producer
1955 – Dana Carvey, American comedian and actor 
  1955   – Nandan Nilekani, Indian businessman, co-founded Infosys 
  1955   – Mani Ratnam, Indian director, producer, and screenwriter
  1955   – Michael Steele, American singer-songwriter and bass player
1956 – Jan Lammers, Dutch race car driver
1957 – Mark Lawrenson, English footballer and manager
1958 – Lex Luger, American wrestler and football player 
1959 – Rineke Dijkstra, Dutch photographer
  1959   – Lydia Lunch, American singer-songwriter, guitarist, and actress
  1959   – Erwin Olaf, Dutch photographer
1960 – Olga Bondarenko, Russian runner
  1960   – Tony Hadley, English singer-songwriter and actor
  1960   – Kyle Petty, American race car driver and sportscaster
1961 – Dez Cadena, American singer-songwriter and guitarist 
1962 – Mark Plaatjes, South African-American runner and coach
1963 – Anand Abhyankar, Indian actor (d. 2012)
1964 – Caroline Link, German director and screenwriter
1965 – Russ Courtnall, Canadian ice hockey player
  1965   – Mark Waugh, Australian cricketer and journalist
  1965   – Steve Waugh, Australian cricketer
1966 – Dayana Cadeau, Haitian born Canadian-American professional bodybuilder
  1966   – Candace Gingrich, American activist
  1966   – Pedro Guerra, Spanish singer-songwriter
  1966   – Petra van Staveren, Dutch swimmer
1967 – Remigija Nazarovienė, Lithuanian heptathlete and coach
  1967   – Mike Stanton, American baseball player
 1967  – Nadhim Zahawi, British politician
1968 – Merril Bainbridge, Australian singer-songwriter
  1968   – Andy Cohen, American television host
  1968   – Lester Green, American comedian, and actor
1969 – Kurt Abbott, American baseball player
  1969   – Paulo Sérgio, Brazilian footballer
  1969   – David Wheaton, American tennis player, radio host, and author
1970 – B Real, American rapper and actor
1971 – Kateřina Jacques, Czech translator and politician
1972 – Wayne Brady, American actor, comedian, game show host, and singer
  1972   – Raúl Ibañez, American baseball player
  1972   – Wentworth Miller, American actor and screenwriter
1973 – Marko Kristal, Estonian footballer and manager
  1973   – Neifi Pérez, Dominican-American baseball player
1974 – Gata Kamsky, Russian-American chess player
  1974   – Matt Serra, American mixed martial artist
1975 – Salvatore Scibona, American author
1976 – Earl Boykins, American basketball player
  1976   – Martin Čech, Czech ice hockey player (d. 2007)
  1976   – Antônio Rodrigo Nogueira, Brazilian mixed martial artist and boxer
  1976   – Tim Rice-Oxley, English singer-songwriter and keyboard player 
1977 – Teet Allas, Estonian footballer
  1977   – A.J. Styles, American wrestler
  1977   – Zachary Quinto, American actor and producer
1978 – Dominic Cooper, English actor
  1978   – Nikki Cox, American actress
  1978   – Yi So-yeon, biotechnologist and astronaut, the first Korean in space
  1978   – Justin Long, American actor
1979 – Morena Baccarin, Brazilian-American actress
  1979   – Butterfly Boucher, Australian singer-songwriter, guitarist, and producer
1980 – Fabrizio Moretti, Brazilian-American drummer 
  1980   – Bobby Simmons, American basketball player
  1980   – Richard Skuse, English rugby player
  1980   – Abby Wambach, American soccer player and coach
  1980   – Tomasz Wróblewski, Polish bass player and songwriter 
1981 – Nikolay Davydenko, Russian tennis player
  1981   – Chin-hui Tsao, Taiwanese baseball player
1982 – Jewel Staite, Canadian actress
1983 – Chris Higgins, American ice hockey player
  1983   – Toni Livers, Swiss skier
1984 – Jack Afamasaga, New Zealand rugby league player
  1984   – Feleti Mateo, Australian-Tongan rugby league player
1985 – Miyuki Sawashiro, Japanese voice actress and singer
1987 – Maryka Holtzhausen, South African netball player
  1987   – Yoann Huget, French rugby player
  1987   – Matthew Koma, American singer-songwriter and guitarist
  1987   – Angelo Mathews, Sri Lankan cricketer
  1987   – Sonakshi Sinha, Indian actress
1988 – Staniliya Stamenova, Bulgarian canoeist
1989 – Steve Smith, Australian cricketer
1992 – Pajtim Kasami, Swiss footballer
1993 – Adam Taggart, Australian footballer
1996 – Morissette, Filipina singer-songwriter
1999 – Campbell Graham, Australian rugby league player
2002 – Madison Hu, American actress

Deaths

Pre-1600
 657 – Pope Eugene I
 891 – Al-Muwaffaq, Abbasid general (b. 842)
 910 – Richilde of Provence (b. 845)
1200 – Bishop John of Oxford
1258 – Peter I, Count of Urgell
1292 – Rhys ap Maredudd, Welsh nobleman and rebel leader
1418 – Katherine of Lancaster, queen of Henry III of Castile
1453 – Álvaro de Luna, Duke of Trujillo, Constable of Castile
1567 – Shane O'Neill, head of the O'Neill dynasty in Ireland (b. 1530)
1572 – Thomas Howard, 4th Duke of Norfolk (b. 1536)
1581 – James Douglas, 4th Earl of Morton, Scottish soldier and politician, Lord Chancellor of Scotland (b. 1525)

1601–1900
1603 – Bernard of Wąbrzeźno, Roman Catholic priest (b. 1575)
1693 – John Wildman, English soldier and politician, Postmaster General of the United Kingdom (b. 1621)
1701 – Madeleine de Scudéry, French author (b. 1607)
1716 – Ogata Kōrin, Japanese painter and educator (b. 1658)
1754 – Ebenezer Erskine, Scottish minister and theologian (b. 1680)
1761 – Jonas Alströmer, Swedish businessman (b. 1685)
1785 – Jean Paul de Gua de Malves, French mathematician and academic (b. 1713)
1806 – William Tate, English painter (b. 1747)
1853 – Henry Trevor, 21st Baron Dacre, English general (b. 1777)
1865 – Ner Middleswarth, American judge and politician (b. 1783)
1875 – Józef Kremer, Polish psychologist, historian, and philosopher (b. 1806)
1881 – Émile Littré, French lexicographer and philosopher (b. 1801)
1882 – Giuseppe Garibaldi, Italian general and politician  (b. 1807)

1901–present
1901 – George Leslie Mackay, Canadian missionary and author (b. 1844)
1927 – Hüseyin Avni Lifij, Turkish painter (b. 1886)
1929 – Enrique Gorostieta, Mexican general (b. 1889)
1933 – Frank Jarvis, American runner and triple jumper (b. 1878)
1937 – Louis Vierne, French organist and composer (b. 1870)
1941 – Lou Gehrig, American baseball player (b. 1903)
1942 – Bunny Berigan, American singer and trumpet player (b. 1908)
1947 – John Gretton, 1st Baron Gretton, English sailor and politician (b. 1867)
1948 – Viktor Brack, German physician (b. 1904)
  1948   – Karl Brandt, German SS officer (b. 1904)
  1948   – Karl Gebhardt, German physician (b. 1897)
  1948   – Waldemar Hoven, German physician (b. 1903)
  1948   – Wolfram Sievers, German SS officer (b. 1905)
1952 – Naum Torbov, Bulgarian architect, designed the Central Sofia Market Hall (b. 1880)
1956 – Jean Hersholt, Danish-American actor and director (b. 1886)
1959 – Lyda Borelli, Italian actress (b. 1884)
1961 – George S. Kaufman, American director, producer, and playwright (b. 1889)
1962 – Vita Sackville-West, English author and poet (b. 1892)
1967 – Benno Ohnesorg, German student and activist (b. 1940)
1968 – André Mathieu, Canadian pianist and composer (b. 1929)
1969 – Leo Gorcey, American actor (b. 1917)
1970 – Orhan Kemal, Turkish author (b. 1914)
  1970   – Albert Lamorisse, French director, producer, and screenwriter (b. 1922)
  1970   – Bruce McLaren, New Zealand race car driver and engineer, founded the McLaren racing team (b. 1937)
  1970   – Giuseppe Ungaretti, Italian soldier, journalist, and academic (b. 1888)
1974 – Hiroshi Kazato, Japanese race car driver (b. 1949)
1976 – Kenneth Mason, English soldier and geographer (b. 1887)
  1976   – Juan José Torres, Bolivian general and politician, 61st President of Bolivia (b. 1920)
1977 – Albert Bittlmayer, German footballer (b. 1952)
  1977   – Stephen Boyd, Northern Irish-born American actor (b. 1931)
1978 – Santiago Bernabéu Yeste, Spanish footballer and coach (b. 1895)
1979 – Jim Hutton, American actor (b. 1934)
1982 – Fazal Ilahi Chaudhry, Pakistani lawyer and politician, 5th President of Pakistan (b. 1904)
  1982   – Shah Abd al-Wahhab, Bangladeshi Islamic scholar (b. 1894)
1983 – Stan Rogers, Canadian singer-songwriter (b. 1949)
  1983   – Ray Stehr, Australian rugby league player and coach (b. 1913)
1986 – Aurèle Joliat, Canadian ice hockey player (b. 1901)
1987 – Anthony de Mello, Indian-American priest and psychotherapist (b. 1931)
  1987   – Sammy Kaye, American bandleader and songwriter (b. 1910)
  1987   – Andrés Segovia, Spanish guitarist (b. 1893)
1988 – Raj Kapoor, Indian actor, director, and producer (b. 1924)
1989 – Ted a'Beckett, Australian cricketer and footballer (b. 1907)
1990 – Rex Harrison, English actor (b. 1908)
1991 – Ahmed Arif, Turkish poet and author (b. 1927)
1992 – Philip Dunne, American director, producer, and screenwriter (b. 1908)
1993 – Johnny Mize, American baseball player, coach, and sportscaster (b. 1913)
  1993   – Tahar Djaout, Algerian journalist, writer and poet (b. 1954)
1994 – David Stove, Australian philosopher, author, and academic (b. 1927)
1996 – John Alton, Hungarian-American cinematographer and director (b. 1901)
  1996   – Leon Garfield, English author (b. 1921)
  1996   – Ray Combs, American game show host (b. 1956)
1997 – Doc Cheatham, American trumpet player, singer, and bandleader (b. 1905)
  1997   – Helen Jacobs, American tennis champion (b. 1908)
1999 – Junior Braithwaite, Jamaican singer (b. 1949)
2000 – Svyatoslav Fyodorov, Russian ophthalmologist, academic, and politician (b. 1927)
  2000   – John Schlee, American golfer (b. 1939)
  2000   – Gerald James Whitrow, English mathematician, cosmologist, and historian (b. 1912)
2001 – Imogene Coca, American actress and comedian (b. 1908)
  2001   – Joey Maxim, American boxer (b. 1922)
2002 – Hugo van Lawick, Dutch director and photographer (b. 1937)
2003 – Freddie Blassie, American wrestler and manager (b. 1918)
  2003   – Alma Ricard, Canadian broadcaster and philanthropist (b. 1906)
2005 – Lucien Cliche, Canadian lawyer and politician (b. 1916)
  2005   – Gunder Gundersen, Norwegian skier (b. 1930)
  2005   – Samir Kassir, Lebanese journalist and educator (b. 1950)
  2005   – Melita Norwood, English civil servant and spy (b. 1912)
2006 – Keith Smith, English rugby player and coach (b. 1952)
2007 – Kentarō Haneda, Japanese pianist and composer (b. 1949)
  2007   – Huang Ju, Chinese engineer and politician, 1st Vice Premier of the People's Republic of China (b. 1938)
2008 – Bo Diddley, American singer-songwriter and guitarist (b. 1928)
  2008   – Mel Ferrer, American actor (b. 1917)
2009 – David Eddings, American author (b. 1931)
2012 – Adolfo Calero, Nicaraguan businessman and political activist (b. 1931)
  2012   – Richard Dawson, English-American soldier, actor, television personality, and game show host (b. 1932)
  2012   – LeRoy Ellis, American basketball player (b. 1940)
  2012   – Kathryn Joosten, American actress (b. 1939)
2013 – Mario Bernardi, Canadian pianist and conductor (b. 1930)
  2013   – Chen Xitong, Chinese politician, 8th Mayor of Beijing (b. 1930)
  2013   – Mandawuy Yunupingu, Australian singer-songwriter and guitarist (b. 1956)
2014 – Ivica Brzić, Serbian footballer and manager (b. 1941)
  2014   – Nikolay Khrenkov, Russian bobsledder (b. 1984)
  2014   – Alexander Shulgin, American pharmacologist and chemist (b. 1925)
2015 – Fernando de Araújo, East Timorese politician, President of East Timor (b. 1963)
  2015   – Irwin Rose, American biologist and academic, Nobel Prize laureate (b. 1926)
2017 – Peter Sallis, English actor (b. 1921)

Holidays and observances
 Children's Day (North Korea)
 Christian feast day:
Ahudemmeh (Syriac Orthodox Church).
 Alexander (martyr)
 Elmo
 Felix of Nicosia
 Marcellinus and Peter
 Martyrs of Lyon, including Blandina
 Pope Eugene I
 Pothinus
 June 2 (Eastern Orthodox liturgics)
 Civil Aviation Day (Azerbaijan)
 Coronation of King Jigme Singye Wangchuck, also Social Forestry Day (Bhutan)
 Day of Hristo Botev (Bulgaria)
 Decoration Day (Canada)
 Festa della Repubblica (Italy)
 International Sex Workers Day
 Telangana Day (Telangana, India)

References

External links

 
 
 

Days of the year
June